Laissez-nous respirer (Let us breathe) is the second studio album by French singer, Ilona Mitrecey. The album was released in 2006. It contains 14 songs, 2 of which are alternate versions of tracks from her first album.

Track listing
 "Laissez-nous respirer"
 "Chiquitas"
 "Sur mes rollers"
 "Kid's of the Universe" [sic]
 "J'ai treize ans"
 "Cool Sunset Party"
 "On s'adore"
 "L'Éléphant blanc"
 "Le Tour du monde"
 "Dans mon jardin"
 "Le Peintre"
 "La Vie est belle"
 "Noël, que du bonheur" (Acoustic version)
 "Un Monde parfait" (Acoustic version)

References

2006 albums
Ilona Mitrecey albums